Yuan Chengfei (born 14 July 1995) is a Chinese weightlifter and  Asian Champion competing in the 69 kg division until 2018 and 73 kg starting in 2018 after the International Weightlifting Federation reorganized the categories.

Career
In early 2019 he competed at the 2019 IWF World Cup in the 73 kg category winning a silver medal in all lifts. He competed at the 2019 Asian Weightlifting Championships in the 73 kg category, winning silver medals in all lifts.

Major results

References

1995 births
Living people
Chinese male weightlifters
21st-century Chinese people